Sample People is a 2000 Australian film, directed by Clinton Smith.  It is about  the entanglements of twelve people in one weekend in Sydney.

The film was originally going to be made for $60,000 but prior to filming it was decided to seek more money. Despite being set in Sydney, it was shot in Adelaide.

Plot
Within the film run multiple plot lines, with the plot and characters intersecting and influencing each other. The seemingly unrelated stories ultimately come together.

Soundtrack
The soundtrack was released through Mushroom Records. The album peaked at number 38 on the ARIA Charts.

Charts

Cast
 Kylie Minogue as Jess
 Ben Mendelsohn as John
 Simon Lyndon as Andy
 David Field as TT
 Paula Arundell as Cleo
 Joel Edgerton as Sem
 Nathalie Roy as DJ Lush Puppy
 Nathan Page as Len
 Justin Rosniak as Joey
 Mathew Wilkinson as Gus
 Gandhi MacIntyre as Phil
 Dorian Nkono as Shiva

Release
The film was given a limited theatrical release, opening in Sydney and Melbourne on 11 May 2000. It then had a release on home video on 27 September 2000.

References

External links

Sample People at Urban Cinefile
Sample People at Ozmovies

Australian crime comedy-drama films
2000s English-language films
2000s Australian films